

Seasons
 1862–63 Barnes F.C. season
 1863–64 Barnes F.C. season
 1864–65 Barnes F.C. season
 1865–66 Barnes F.C. season
 1866–67 Barnes F.C. season
 1867–68 Barnes F.C. season
 1868–69 Barnes F.C. season
 1869–70 Barnes F.C. season
 1870–71 Barnes F.C. season
 1871–72 Barnes F.C. season
 1872–73 Barnes F.C. season
 1873–74 Barnes F.C. season

 
Barnes